Junonia goudotii is a butterfly in the family Nymphalidae. It is found on Madagascar, the Comoros and Mauritius. The habitat consists of forest margins and transformed grassland.

References

goudotii
Butterflies of Africa
Butterflies described in 1833